Atanas Georgiev Skatov (born Atanas Georgiev Dimitrov; 11 March 1978 – 5 February 2021) was a Bulgarian mountaineer, vegan and agronomist in plant protection.

On 24 May 2014 he claimed to have become the first known vegan to ascend Everest. His attempt was later refuted, as he admitted to having consumed honey, and currently the record is held by Kuntal Joisher. He was attempting to become the first known vegan to summit the 14 highest summits on Earth and successfully reached the top of 10 of them; Everest (north and south routes), Manaslu, Annapurna, Makalu, Lhotse, Cho Oyu, Kangchenjunga, Gasherbrum I, Gasherbrum II, and Dhaulagiri.

On 20 June 2017, Skatov ascended Mount Denali in Alaska and became the first Bulgarian and the world's first vegan to climb successfully the Seven Summits.

He died on 5th February 2021 while descending from Camp 3 at K2 after his unsuccessful ascent.

Biography 
Atanas Skatov was born on 11 March 1978 in Sliven, Bulgaria. In 2001, he graduated with distinction from the Agricultural University in Plovdiv, Bulgaria and held a master's degree in plant protection. During his study he gained two scholarships, allowing him to study for two semesters at Humboldt University, Berlin, Germany. From 2001 to 2004, he was a full-time PhD student, in the departments of both horticulture and phytomedicine (plant protection). In February 2005, he received a Doctorate degree in Agricultural Science after successfully presenting his dissertation on “Integrated Tomato Production (Lycopersicon esculentum) in a glasshouse with an emphasis on integrated and biological pest control against the greenhouse whitefly (Trialeurodes vaporariorum westwood)”.

In 2015, he published his first book "The Mother Goddess of the Universe". At the same time his first documentary movie: Skatov, The Experiment, Episode 1: The First Vegan on Everest  was released. Skatov has published scientific articles in Bulgaria and abroad. He has been generating significant media attention, regarding his latest project: Climbing the 14 highest summits on the planet without consumption of food of animal origin.

Skatov has one son, born in 2009.

Skatov said he had never been on a mountain until 2010, and before 2012 had never been an active sports person. Without passing even a basic mountaineering or climbing training program, he became the first known person of the world on a vegan diet who climbed the highest summits on six of the continents in less than two years, climbing four eight – thousanders in a week apiece. He is the first Bulgarian mountaineer taking part in four expeditions to climb eight-thousanders in a single season.

Skatov became a vegan in January 2012, and decided to test this kind of diet by climbing the highest summits of each continent in the world, testing his physical and mental endurance. He has chosen the high-altitude mountaineering as it allows a human being to put his physical and mental health under intense pressure.

In 2015, Skatov was awarded a “Honorary Citizen” of Sliven, Bulgaria.

In 2018, Skatov who climbed the sixth highest peak on the planet Cho Oyu (8201 m) without supplemental oxygen has received the Golden Bulgaria badge for Best Athlete of May.

In 2019, Skatov was awarded the Green Person of Bulgaria for 2019.

In 2020, he published his first book in English - The First Vegan on Everest.

November 2020 saw the release of Skatov's 7th book which is dedicated to SE7EN SUMMITS VEGAN project. It has over 650 pages and author's only images.

Scientific research 
Skatov has conducted scientific researches in areas such as: 
 Morphology; bio ecology and controlling horticultural pests on crops (Trialeurodes vaporariorum westwood, Tetranychus urticae koch, Bradysia difformis frey, Myzus persicae sulzer, Aphis gossypi glover, etc.);
 Insecticidal effect of certain plant extracts, such as: pine oil, castor oil, lavender oil, quasi (Quassia amara), pyrethrum, azadirachtine, etc.;
 Beneficial insects: Encarsia formosa Gahan, Macrolophus pygmaeus Rambur, Dacnusa sibirica Telenga, Lysiphlebus testacepies Cresson, Phytoseiulus persimilis Athias-Henriot, etc.;
 Entomopathogenic fungi - Verticillium lecanii (Zimmerman) Viegas;
 Pests in stored products;
 Hydroponic methods of growing crops in greenhouses.

Mountaineering career 
At 14 years of age, as a school boy at the Gymnasium of Electronics and Electrical Engineering in Sliven, Skatov dreamed of completing Bulgaria's longest high-mountain hiking trail from Kom to Emine (650 km). This dream came true 18 years later, in the summer of 2010. In his childhood, until the age of 18, he had been part of the prominent folklore dance ensemble “Trakiyche”. Until 2012, he had never participated in any sports competitions. He started in the summer of 2010, when for the first time he hiked the Kom-Emine trail. Later in 2011 and 2012 he repeated the hike, captivated by the magic of the mountain. In the mountains, he considered what could be done for the safety of the planet. Since 2000, he was concerned that the world's population is constantly growing and that agricultural areas are limited.

At the end of 2011, he had the idea to become a vegan and to climb the highest peaks on all continents as well as all eight–thousanders as one. In that way, he combined veganism and mountaineering in his first Project: Climbing the highest peaks on all seven continents as a vegan. In less than two years he reached the highest summits of all seven continents.

Skatov was self-educated in the subject of climbing and mountaineering. He did not conduct preliminary research on a given peak prior to the expedition, in order to feel the spirit of the pioneers who hadn't known what to expect while climbing.

In 2015, he launched his second project: climbing the 14 highest summits on the planet, the "Crown of the Himalaya” without consumption of food of animal origin (including an expedition to the eighth highest peak on the planet – Manaslu, 8163 m., which had not been climbed by a Bulgarian before). Only Skatov, from all the mountaineers present in the autumn of 2015, made three consecutive attempts to attack the peak and on 1 October 2015 at 5:50 am he reached the peak. Only a few hours prior, another Bulgarian mountaineer, Boyan Petrov, had climbed the summit in his first attempt. Skatov then became the second Bulgarian and possibly the second vegan in the world to have climbed Manaslu.

In 2016, Skatov took part in three expeditions for climbing eight-thousanders in Himalayas before monsoons in spring, which no other Bulgarian had done before and there are just a few similar cases in the world. On 16 April he reached 7700 m. of Annapurna I, 8091 m. with another five mountaineers, but due to the bad weather he was forced down to the Base Camp. However, on 1 May 2016 he climbed successfully the tenth highest summit on the planet – Annapurna I, which is the deadliest one, possibly being the first vegan to step on the peak of Annapurna. Immediately after Annapurna, he tried to climb Dhaulagiri, 8172 m., reaching 7900 m. in alpine style on 15 May 2016. He didn't have time for second attempt because he had a bigger target in mind, the fifth highest peak in the world – Makalu, 8485 m.

Having only one day to rest, after Dhaulagiri he aimed at Makalu and after only one night at Base Camp, started his climb at Makalu, in alpine style. On 23 May, at 12:00 pm, Skatov became the first known vegan to climb Makalu for just 96 hours with only one night at the Base Camp before the attack. Thus, for 23 days he participated in three expeditions on eight-thousanders, two of them in alpine style in less than a week, for the first time in the world from a Bulgarian and a known vegan.

Two weeks after his return from 80-day triple expedition in Nepal, on 15 June 2016 Skatov flew to Pakistan, where he joined in an expedition to Gasherbrum I and Gasherbrum II. For Skatov, it was important to constantly pursue the limits of his physical and mental strength while on a vegan diet. After almost a month on Base Camp Gasherbrum, time spent for acclimatisation, on 21 July, he headed towards Camp I at Gasherbrum II. On 22 July, snow started to fall for 26 hours nonstop, so on 23 July, Skatov went down to Base Camp and suspended the expedition.

For 2016, Skatov participated in four expeditions above 8000 meters, which hadn't been done by any other known vegan or a Bulgarian. Skatov considered that examining the vegan diet is the most prominent scientific research he has ever done. In January 2017, he marked six years of the beginning of his vegan lifestyle which he said he has no intention to change. He was regularly subject to blood tests, checking the importance of human being indices. Additionally, he maintained a diary regarding sport activities and his mental health.

In 2017, Skatov took part in two expeditions for climbing eight-thousanders in Himalayas before monsoons. On 16 May 2017 he climbed successfully the fourth highest summit on the planet -Lhotse, 8516m. Only 5 days later Skatov climbed successfully on 22 May Everest, 8848m. for second time, but now from south side. Skatov is the first Bulgarian, who climbed Mount Everest from north and from south ridges.

After Lhotse and Everest, Skatov climbed solo in alpine style on 20 June 2017 his last one of Seven summits-Denali, 6197m.

In 2018, Atanas Skatov summited Mt. Cho Oyu (8188m) without the help of supplemental oxygen or Sherpa help on 13 May at 16:20pm (Chinese time). He is the first Bulgarian to have done so. After having climbed continuously for 13 hours without drinking or eating anything Atanas was extremely exhausted. He had not slept for 2 nights.

In 2019, Skatov summited four eight-thousanders Kangchenjunga, Gasherbrum I, Gasherbrum II and now Dhaulagiri.

Death 
Skatov died on 5 February 2021 due to a fall while descending K2 in Pakistan.

Expeditions

References

1978 births
2021 deaths
Bulgarian agronomists
Bulgarian mountain climbers
People from Sliven
Veganism activists
Mountaineering deaths on K2